Apache Aries, a Blueprint Container implementations and extensions of application-focused specifications defined by OSGi Enterprise Expert Group. The project aims to deliver a set of pluggable Java components enabling an enterprise OSGi application programming model. The Aries project Content includes the following:
 WAR to Web Application Bundle Converter
 Blueprint Container
 Java Persistence API integration
 Java Transaction API integration
 Java Management Extensions
 Java Naming and Directory Interface integration
 Application Assembly and Deployment
 Apache Maven Plugin
 META-INF/services handler
 Samples, tutorials, documentation, and integrator's guide

See also
Virgo (software)

References

External links

Aries
Free software programmed in Java (programming language)